Biraj Bahu is a 1954 Hindi film produced by Hiten Choudhury and directed by Bimal Roy, and based on a  Bengali novel by Saratchandra Chattopadhyay. The film stars Kamini Kaushal, Abhi Bhattacharya and Pran and has music by Salil Chowdhury. The film won the All India Certificate of Merit for Best Feature Film.

Madhubala, the highest-paid actress of that time, was eager to play the lead role in the film. She had visited Bimal Roy's office several times for this purpose. However, thinking that she would ask for high fee for doing the film, he cast Kamini Kaushal instead of her. Learning that her fee lost her the role, she had said that she would have acted for even one rupee in Biraj Bahu.

Plot
Biraj (Kamini Kaushal) was married off to Nilambar Chakraborty (Abhi Bhattacharya) when she was a little girl. The couple is childless. Nilambar is pious, generous and loving, but unemployed. His devious younger brother takes advantage of Nilambar's naiveté to force a partition of the home and buy off their joint land under an assumed name from the lender it was mortgaged to. Nilambar and Biraj are reduced to a wretched existence. To make matters worse, Deodhar, a wealthy young contractor who arrives in the village, is captivated by Biraj's beauty and tries to bribe her erstwhile maid Sundari, to lure her to his boat. After several dramatic twists and turns, Biraj is kidnapped, but she jumps off the boat before he can do anything. She runs away from the hospital in the middle of the night to see her husband one last time. He had promised that he would bless her at the time of her death and that she would die at his feet.

Cast
 Kamini Kaushal as Biraj Chakravorty
 Abhi Bhattacharya as Nilambher Chakravorty 
 Shakuntala as Punnu Chakravorty
 Pran  as Deodhar
 Randhir as Pitambar Chakravorty
 Manorama as Sundari (Maidservant)
 Kammo		
 Vikram Kapoor (as Bikram Kapoor)
 Nazima (as Baby Chand)
 Iftekhar Kishorilal, Deodhar's assistant 
 Moni Chatterjee as Bholanath
 Sarita Devi	
 Shivji Bhai as Sheojibhai
 Maya Dass	as Maya Das
 Dasarathlal as Dashrothlal
 Sailen Bose

Music
The music for the film was composed by Salil Chowdhury, with lyrics written by Prem Dhawan
 "Meraa Mann Bhula Bhula Kahe Dole" - Hemant Kumar
 "Jhum Jhum Manmohan Re Murali" - Hemant Kumar
 "Suno Seeta Ki Kahani Ke Wo Mahlo Ki Rani" - Mohammed Rafi
 "Na Jane Re Na Jane Re, Saiya Man Ki Battiya" - Shamshad Begum
 "Tera Ghar Aabad Rahe Ja Ri Dulhaniya Ja Jaha Rahe" - Shyamal Mitra, Lata Mangeshkar

Awards

 1954: National Film Awards for All India Certificate of Merit for Best Feature Film
 1955: Filmfare Best Director Award for Bimal Roy
 1955: Filmfare Best Actress Award for Kamini Kaushal
 1955: Palme d'Or - Cannes Film Festival: Nominated.

References

External links
 Biraj Bahu Upperstall
 
 

1950s Hindi-language films
Films directed by Bimal Roy
Films scored by Salil Chowdhury
Indian black-and-white films
Films based on works by Sarat Chandra Chattopadhyay
Filmfare Awards winners
Indian drama films
1954 drama films